This is a list of programs currently broadcast by the American television network NBC.

Current programming

Dramas
Law & Order (1990–2010; 2022)
Law & Order: Special Victims Unit (1999)
Chicago Fire (2012)
The Blacklist (2013)
Chicago P.D. (2014)
Chicago Med (2015)
Law & Order: Organized Crime (2021)
La Brea (2021)
Quantum Leap (2022)
Magnum P.I. (2023) (moved from CBS)

Comedies
Young Rock (2021)
American Auto (2021)
Grand Crew (2021)
Lopez vs Lopez (2022)
Night Court (2023)

Docuseries
Who Do You Think You Are? (2010–12; 2022)

Reality/non-scripted
America's Got Talent (2006)
The Voice (2011)
American Ninja Warrior (2012)
Baking It (2021; also on Peacock)
American Song Contest (2022)
Dancing with Myself (2022)
America's Got Talent: All-Stars (2023)

Game shows
Weakest Link (2001–02; 2020)
The Wall (2016)
Capital One College Bowl (1963–70, previously aired on NBC Radio Network from 1953–55; 2021)
That's My Jam (2021)
Password (2022)
The Wheel (2022)

Award shows
The Golden Globe Awards (1958–68; 1974)
People's Choice Awards (2021)

Talk shows
3rd Hour Today (2018)
Today with Hoda & Jenna (2019)

Late-night shows
Saturday Night Live (1975)
The Tonight Show Starring Jimmy Fallon (2014)
Late Night with Seth Meyers (2014)

News

Meet the Press (1947)
Today (1952)
NBC Nightly News (1970)
Saturday Today (1992)
Dateline NBC (1992)
Early Today (1999)
1st Look (2008)
Sunday Today with Willie Geist (2016)
NBC News Daily (2022)

Specials
Macy's Thanksgiving Day Parade (experimental local broadcasts in 1939, then again starting from 1945; broadcast nationally since 1953)
How The Grinch Stole Christmas (acquired the broadcast rights in 2015)
The National Dog Show (since 2002)
Macy's Fourth of July Spectacular (earliest records are from 1996)
Miss America Competition (livestreamed since 2019)

Saturday morning

A New Leaf (2019)
Consumer 101 (2018)
Earth Odyssey with Dylan Dreyer (2019)
One Team: The Power of Sports (2021)
Roots Less Traveled (2020)
Vets Saving Pets (2018)
Wild Child (2021)

Sports

Olympics on NBC, which includes:
Summer Olympic Games
Winter Olympic Games
NFL on NBC, which includes:
Football Night in America
Sunday Night Football 
NFL Kickoff Game
The NFL on Thanksgiving Day
Select playoff games
The Super Bowl (every four years)
Golf Channel on NBC, which includes:
The Open Championship
The Players Championship
The Ryder Cup
Presidents Cup
Scottish Open
Senior PGA Championship
Thoroughbred Racing on NBC, which includes the following races:
Kentucky Derby
Preakness Stakes
Belmont Stakes
Breeders' Cup Classic
Santa Anita Derby
College and high school football, including:
Notre Dame Football on NBC
The Bayou Classic 
The All-American Bowl
US Olympic Trials
Tennis on NBC, which includes the French Open
Boxing on NBC, which includes  Premier Boxing Champions bouts
World Athletics Championships
Select Diamond League meetings, which includes the Prefontaine Classic
USA Outdoor Track and Field Championships
FINA World Aquatics Championships
United States Swimming National Championships
Select matches of the Premier League
U.S. Figure Skating Championships
Select stages of the Tour de France
Select stages of the USA Pro Cycling Challenge
Select NASCAR on NBC races
Select IndyCar Series races, which includes the Indianapolis 500
USFL (2022)

Upcoming programming

Dramas  

Found (2023–24 season)
The Irrational (TBA)

Comedies

Untitled Mike O'Malley project (2023–24 season)

Docuseries
LA Fire and Rescue (2022–23 season)
The New World (2024)
Surviving Earth (TBA)

Reality/non-scripted
 Hot Wheels: Ultimate Challenge (TBA)

Pilots

Dramas
Murder by the Book
 Wolf

Comedies
Non-Evil Twin
St. Denis Medical

Put pilot

Dramas
Grosse Pointe Garden Society

In development

Dramas
The Chase
Connection
Delia Graves and the Order of Merlin
Eliza Starts a Rumor
The Hunting Party
Honor 
In Between
Life, Changing
K-Town
Knockoffs
Peachtree Bluff
Point Nemo
The Santos of Chicago
Sky On Fire
Untitled Joshua Troke/Mickey Fisher/Justin Lin series

Comedies
Amigos
For Better and Worse
I Can't Right Now
Le Coq
Most Talkative
The Regal
Untitled Marlee Matlin project
Untitled Wood/Pierre-Outlar project

Former programming

References

 
NBC